Gustaaf Van Cauter, (born 31 March 1948) is a former racing cyclist.  He was born in Mechelen, Belgium. He competed in the team time trial at the 1972 Summer Olympics. As of 2010, Van Cauter is President of molecular imaging company Bioscan.

Major sport achievements 
1970
 winner 1st étape at the Tour de Namur
1971
 world champion, 100 km team road race
1972
 3rd place, 1972 Summer Olympics, 100 km team road race

References

External links
 All cycling results Olympia '72
 All time olympic results

1948 births
Living people
Belgian male cyclists
Sportspeople from Mechelen
Cyclists from Antwerp Province
Olympic cyclists of Belgium
Cyclists at the 1972 Summer Olympics
UCI Road World Champions (elite men)